Yangsu Tegin was a Gökturk prince. According to Lev Gumilyov, he was a son of Tardu, however Takeshi Osawa suggested that he was a son of Muqan Qaghan and father of Niri Qaghan.

References 

Ashina house of the Turkic Empire
History of Bukhara
589 deaths
6th-century Turkic people